James Husband (born 15 October 1947) is an English retired professional footballer who played in England and the United States as a striker.

Club career
Born in Newcastle upon Tyne, Northumberland, Husband began his career with the youth teams of Everton. He turned professional in 1964, and was part of the side that won the First Division in the 1969–70 season; making 30 appearances and scoring 6 goals in the process. He also played as they won the 1970 FA Charity Shield. He later played for Luton Town. Husband also played in the NASL for the Memphis Rogues. In 1982, he played for the Oklahoma City Slickers in the American Soccer League.

International career
Husband played for England at Schools, Youth, and under-23 levels.

References

1947 births
Living people
American Soccer League (1933–1983) players
Cleveland Force (original MISL) players
English footballers
England under-23 international footballers
English expatriate footballers
Everton F.C. players
Luton Town F.C. players
Major Indoor Soccer League (1978–1992) players
Memphis Rogues players
North American Soccer League (1968–1984) players
Oklahoma City Slickers (ASL) players
English expatriate sportspeople in the United States
Expatriate soccer players in the United States
Association football forwards
England youth international footballers
Footballers from Newcastle upon Tyne
FA Cup Final players